Ramën Çepele (born 21 March 2003) is a footballer who plays as a centre-back for Hannover 96. Born in Italy, he began his youth international career with Italy before switching to represent the Albania national team.

Club career
Çepele played at A.S.D. Liventina in his youth, before joining the Inter Milan youth academy in 2017. In 2020, he moved to the under-19 team of German club Hannover 96.

International career
Çepele made his international debut for Albania on 11 November 2020 in a friendly match against Kosovo.

Career statistics

International

References

External links
 
 
 
 
 
 Italy under-15 international statistics
 Italy under-16 international statistics

2003 births
Living people
People from Conegliano
Albanian footballers
Albania international footballers
Italian footballers
Italy youth international footballers
Italian people of Albanian descent
Albanian expatriate footballers
Italian expatriate footballers
Albanian expatriate sportspeople in Germany
Italian expatriate sportspeople in Germany
Expatriate footballers in Germany
Association football central defenders
Inter Milan players
Regionalliga players
Hannover 96 II players
Sportspeople from the Province of Treviso
Footballers from Veneto